Penstemon utahensis is a species of penstemon known by the common names Utah beardtongue and Utah penstemon. It is native to the southwestern United States, where it grows in scrub, woodland, and canyons. It is a perennial herb growing erect to a maximum height near half a meter. The thick leaves are located around the base of the plant and in opposite pairs along the stem. The upper leaves are lance-shaped and often folded lengthwise, measuring up to 5.5 centimeters long. The showy inflorescence bears many bright red-pink flowers up to 2.5 centimeters in length. They are cylindrical, tubular, or funnel-shaped with wide, lobed mouths, and mostly hairless to slightly hairy and glandular.

External links
Jepson Manual Treatment
Southwest Colorado Wildflowers
Photo gallery

utahensis
Flora of the Southwestern United States